The Division Street Bridge is an historic roadway and sidewalk stone arch bridge in Pawtucket, Rhode Island, carrying Division Street over the Seekonk River. The structure was built in 1875–1877 at a cost of USD$95,000. It is said to be a symbolic icon of the unity of the two neighborhoods, which are divided by the river, coming together as the Town of Pawtucket. The bridge was listed on the National Register of Historic Places in 1983. Although it may be "functionally obsolete" relative to traffic patterns and in need of repairs, it is considered to be architecturally and historically significant.

Design 
The piers of the bridge are constructed of coursed granite ashlar and the voussoirs are dressed granite with single keystones. The spandrels, the space between the arches, are filled with mortared granite rubble, and the arch barrels are constructed with an estimated 550,000 bricks. The original roadway was made of granite blocks, the seams of which were filled with tar, but this has been modified with modern asphalt paving and with the piers being modified with the addition of reinforced concrete sheathing for the river piers. The iron walkways, produced by Crowell and Sisson, project over both the sides of the bridge with iron brackets.

Constructed from 1875 to 1877 at a cost of USD $95,000, the details of the bridge's construction and its architect are unknown. A contemporary account states that the need for the bridge was first proposed in 1871, but it wasn't until a town meeting on March 1, 1875, that it would be decided upon in a vote. A commission to oversee the project included C. B. Farnsworth, William T. Adams, and William R. Walker, and the contract was awarded to Horace Foster.  A local architect, William R. Walker was on the town's committee, but his role in the design or appearance of the bridge is unknown. Other figures involved in the construction of the bridge include Cushing and Company, later known as Cushing and Shedd, consulting engineers, and Horace Foster was the general contractor. Though it originally began as a contract for US$71,000, the bridge would increase in costs to US$95,000 due to the changes that were made. The granite was sourced from the towns of Sterling, Connecticut and Westerly, Rhode Island. Repairs for the bridge listed in the 1906 annual report recorded US$15.82 for unspecified work. Though listed as only a footnote, repairs to the bridge were made in 1918.

Current state 
The Division Street Bridge was last rehabilitated in 1985, but it remains open under no restrictions after its inspection in May 2012. Data from the National Bridge Inventory lists the superstructure and substructure as in fair condition. The scour condition is critical, but the recommended work is rehabilitation of the structure.

The report estimates the cost of repairs to be US$9,834,000. A collection of reports dating back to 1995 lists the bridge as "functionally obsolete" for its current traffic requirements. A 2006 traffic report listed the bridge as carrying 21,900 vehicles daily. In 2007 the historic bridge saw an increase in traffic, as a heavy truck detour during the reconstruction of the nearby I-95 Pawtucket Bridge. In 2012, the Pawtucket River Bridge reopened without weight restrictions to northbound traffic. The Division Street Bridge is used as part of a detour in the event of closure of the I-95 Pawtucket River bridge.

Loads on the route which goes over the bridge have twice been reduced, and are now limited to 18 tons to help preserve the bridge.

Significance 
The Division Street Bridge is architecturally significant as the longest stone arch bridge in Rhode Island and historically significant as a symbolic gesture to link and unify the two rapidly growing neighborhoods on Pawtucket Falls under the newly formed Town of Pawtucket. The bridge was listed on the National Register of Historic Places in 1983.

See also

 List of bridges on the National Register of Historic Places in Rhode Island
 National Register of Historic Places listings in Pawtucket, Rhode Island

References

Notes

Citations

Sources

Further reading

External links

Bridges completed in 1877
Road bridges on the National Register of Historic Places in Rhode Island
Industrial archaeological sites in the United States
Buildings and structures in Pawtucket, Rhode Island
National Register of Historic Places in Pawtucket, Rhode Island
1877 establishments in Rhode Island
Bridges in Providence County, Rhode Island
Stone arch bridges in the United States